Meshi may refer to:
 Meshi, a Japanese rice dish; see List of Japanese dishes#Meshi
 Meshi, Japanese name of Repast (film), a film by Mikio Naruse